Khodayevsky is a rural locality (a settlement) in 12 let Oktyabrya Selsoviet of Pospelikhinsky District, Altai Krai, Russia. The population was 3 in 2014.

Geography 
Khodayevsky is located 50 km south of Pospelikha (the district's administrative centre) by road. Blagodatny is the nearest rural locality.

References 

Rural localities in Pospelikhinsky District